Tadlock is a surname. Notable people with the surname include:

 Clara Moyse Tadlock (1840–1926), American poet
 Johnny Tadlock, American politician
 Tad Tadlock (1931–2000), American dancer
 Tim Tadlock (born 1968), American baseball coach

See also
 Tonya Tadlock; see Franklin Delano Floyd